Marcipalina is a genus of moths of the family Erebidae. The genus was erected by Jean Pelletier in 1978.

Species
Marcipalina albescens (Pelletier, 1975) Ivory Coast
Marcipalina berioi (Pelletier, 1975) Zaire
Marcipalina clenchi (Pelletier, 1975) Cameroon
Marcipalina confluens (Hampson, 1926) Ghana, Ivory Coast, Cameroon, Guinea
Marcipalina conjuncta (Gaede, 1939) Ivory Coast, Cameroon, Zaire, Uganda
Marcipalina detersa (Holland, 1894) Gabon
Marcipalina grisescens Pelletier, 1978 Uganda
Marcipalina hayesi (Pelletier, 1975) Gabon, Zaire, Uganda
Marcipalina laportei (Pelletier, 1975) Gabon, Cameroon, Zaire
Marcipalina lineata Pelletier, 1978 Cameroon
Marcipalina lutea Pelletier, 1978 Gabon, Cameroon, Zaire
Marcipalina melanoconia (Hampson, 1926) Ghana, Cameroon, Central African Republic
Marcipalina minima Pelletier, 1978 Zair, Central African Republic, Uganda
Marcipalina modesta Pelletier, 1979 Cameroon, Gabon
Marcipalina obscura Pelletier, 1978 Uganda
Marcipalina pustulata (Holland, 1894) Ivory Coast, Gabon, Guinea, Zaire, Rwanda
Marcipalina rubra Pelletier, 1978 Uganda
Marcipalina ruptisignoides Pelletier, 1978 Ivory Coast, Cameroon, Gabon, Guinea, Central African Republic, Zaire, Congo, Uganda
Marcipalina submarginalis (Gaede, 1939) Zaire
Marcipalina tanzaniensis (Pelletier, 1975) Tanzania
Marcipalina triangulifera (Holland, 1894) Gabon, Equatorial Guinea, Cameroon
Marcipalina umbrosa (Holland, 1894) Ivory Coast, Gabon, Zaire, Uganda
Marcipalina violacea (Pelletier, 1974) Gabon, Cameroon

References

External links

Calpinae